Zheleznogorsk is a town in Kursk Oblast, Russia, located  northwest of Kursk. Its population according to censuses taken in varying years is:

History
Zheleznogorsk was founded in 1957 due to the development of iron ore deposits in the Kursk Magnetic Anomaly. It was granted town status in 1962.

Administrative and municipal status
Within the framework of administrative divisions, Zheleznogorsk serves as the administrative center of Zheleznogorsky District, even though it is not a part of it. As an administrative division, it is incorporated separately as the town of oblast significance of Zheleznogorsk—an administrative unit with the status equal to that of the districts. As a municipal division, the town of oblast significance of Zheleznogorsk is incorporated as Zheleznogorsk Urban Okrug.
Basis of Zheleznogorsk economy is manufacturing. There are located 18 big industrial factories, the biggest among them is Mikhailovsky Mining and Refining Facility. In 2015 it produced 18% of total mining production in Russia.

References

Notes

Sources

External links

Official website of Zheleznogorsk 
Zheleznogorsk Business Directory 

Cities and towns in Kursk Oblast
Oryol Governorate
Cities and towns built in the Soviet Union
Populated places established in 1957
1957 establishments in the Soviet Union